Hurricane Orlene was a powerful tropical cyclone that caused minor damage to the Pacific coast of Mexico in October 2022. The cyclone was the sixteenth named storm, ninth hurricane, and third major hurricane of the 2022 Pacific hurricane season. Orlene originated from a low-pressure area off the coast of Mexico. Soon afterward, Orlene rapidly weakened and became a tropical depression, eventually dissipating over the Sierra Madre Occidental late on October 4.

Orlene prompted the issuance of hurricane and tropical storm watches and warnings for Northwestern Mexico. The storm's knocked out power to nearly 49,092 customers in two states. Orlene caused minor damage to many schools. Damage in San Blas was estimated to be in excess of MX$12 million (US$600,000).

Meteorological history

On September 25, the National Hurricane Center (NHC) noted the possible development of a low-pressure area located several miles offshore the south of the Southwestern Mexico coast which was conducive for further tropical cyclogenesis  The low produced a large area of disorganized showers and thunderstorms. Satellite imagery showed that the associated shower activity was showing signs of organization. By September 29, the NHC initiated advisories on Tropical Depression Sixteen-E. Six hours later, the depression strengthened into a tropical storm, and was assigned the name Orlene. Orlene become better organized, with a small central dense overcast forming. There was a burst of deep convection and a gradual increase in satellite presentation.

Microwave imagery revealed a well-defined curved band wrapping into a developing inner core. Orlene strengthened into a hurricane at 15:00 UTC on October 1, with central convection becoming more symmetric. An Air Force Reserve reconnaissance aircraft recorded 700 mb flight-level winds of  around the northeastern eyewall. Later that day, Orlene intensified, reaching Category 2 hurricane. Southwestern wind shear began to increase, as the eye had become cloud-filled as a result, the hurricane weakened to Category 3 strength.

The center of the storm, embedded within an area of cloud top temperatures below . Orlene weakened to Category 2 strength at 03:00 UTC on October 3. Orlene's cloud pattern became less organized, due to the influence of strong southwesterly shear associated with an upper-level trough near Baja California. Orlene made landfall just north of the Nayarit and Sinaloa border's, weakening to a Category 1 strength by 13:45 UTC. By 18:00 UTC, the storms moved inland and weakened, into a tropical storm. Orlene rapidly weakened, becoming a tropical depression at 21:00 UTC that same day. The system later dissipated over Sierra Madre Occidental late on October 4.

Preparations and impact 

The Government of Mexico issued a hurricane warning on September 30 for Islas Marías, with tropical storm watches and warnings posted on the coast of San Blas and Manzanillo. In the state of Sinaloa, emergency shelters were opened. The ports of Manzanillo and Puerto Vallarta were closed. According to the Secretary of Tourism of Mazatlan, Rosario Torres Noriega, flights at the airport were suspended due to the approaching storm. Classes were also suspended in Jalisco. Ten municipalities in Jalisco were placed under a "orange" alert. Red alerts were issued for Sinaloa, and Nayarit. More than 300 operational officers and different dependencies were deployed. The State Civil Protection (UEPC) of the Government of Colima were advised to take necessary precautions.

Orlene brought heavy rains that caused landslide in Durango-Mazatlán Superhighway. Orlene produced large swells, affecting areas from the west coast of Mexico. In the municipality of Escuinapa, heavy winds brought down an electricity tower, causing the area to be left without power. Fallen poles and downed trees were reported throughout El Rosario. Border crossings from the state of Sinaloa into the state of Nayarit were minimalized after Orlene made landfall. Orlene affected families approximately 700 people. 242 schools were impacted, receiving minor damage. In Puerto Vallarta, the hurricane caused widespread flooding in the communities. So far, no victims or significant damage have been reported, according to Nayarit's Secretary of Security, Jorge Rodríguez.

Heavy rains were reported across the Acaponeta. Plan DN-III-E, a disaster relief and rescue plan, was activated in Sinaloa after the passage of Orlene. 80 houses were affected in La Huerta. The Federal Electricity Commission (CFE) were deployed its crews to repair the damage caused by the strong winds. The CFE reported 49,092 customers lost electricity across Sinaloa and Nayarit, due to Orlene. Overall, Orlene left at least MX$12 million (US$600,000) of damage in San Blas.

See also

Weather of 2022
Tropical cyclones in 2022
List of Category 4 Pacific hurricanes
Other storms of the same name
Hurricane Patricia — Hit the same areas 7 years before
Tropical Storm Sonia (2013) — Hit the same areas
Hurricane Roslyn (2022) — Category 4 hurricane that hit the same areas two weeks later

References

External links

 The National Hurricane Center's advisory archive on Hurricane Orlene

2022 Pacific hurricane season
Tropical cyclones in 2022
Category 4 Pacific hurricanes
October 2022 events in Mexico
2022 in Mexico
Pacific hurricanes in Mexico